This page lists all the tours, and matches played by Pakistan national field hockey team from 2015 to 2019. During this period Pakistan's most successful tournaments were the Asian Champions Trophy (Champions: 2018) and South Asian Games (Champions: 2016). Worst results were failing to qualify for the 2016 Summer Olympics, first time Pakistan failed to qualify for the event and successively did not qualify for the 2020 Summer Olympics. Pakistan lost 9–1 to Australia in 2017 the biggest defeat in history for the team till now.

List of tours

Matches

2015

International Hockey Challenge

2015 Series – South Korea

2014–15 FIH Hockey World League – Semifinals

2016

2016 South Asian Games

2016 Sultan Azlan Shah Cup

2016 Asian Champions Trophy

2017

2017 Series – New Zealand

2017 Series – Australia

2017 Series – Ireland

2016–17 FIH Hockey World League – Semifinals

2017 Hockey Asia Cup

International Hockey Festival

2018

2018 Series – Triangular

2018 Commonwealth Games

2018 Hockey Champions Trophy

2018 Asian Games

2018 Asian Champions Trophy

2018 FIH Hockey World Cup

2019

2019 Series – Germany

2019 FIH Olympic Qualifiers

References 

Field hockey in Pakistan